Sajerpar Ghoramara is a small village in Cooch Behar district of West Bengal, India.

Villages in Cooch Behar district